Oluyole FM (98.5 MHz) is a Nigerian radio station in Ibadan, owned by the public Broadcasting Corporation of Oyo State (BCOS). BCOS also operates television channel BCOS TV.

The station went on air in 1972 as a companion to an AM service and was known as Radio O.Y.O. 2 until 2009, when the name was changed by Otunba Christopher Adebayo Alao-Akala, former governor of the state.

References 

Radio stations in Nigeria
Radio stations established in 1972
1972 establishments in Nigeria